The Bangladesh Navy is the naval warfare branch of the Bangladesh Armed Forces, responsible for Bangladesh's  of maritime territorial area, and the defence of important harbours, military bases and economic zones. The primary role of the Bangladesh Navy is to protect the country's economic and military interests at home and abroad. The Bangladesh navy is also a front line disaster management force in Bangladesh, and participates in humanitarian missions abroad. It is a key regional player in counter terrorism efforts, and engages in global peacekeeping with the United Nations.

History

Origins
The Bangladesh Navy was created as part of Bangladesh Forces during Bangladesh's 1971 liberation war against Pakistan. Its official creation date is July 1971 during the Bangladesh Sector Commanders Conference 1971. In 1971, with West Pakistan imposing a brutal military crackdown in East Pakistan, the Bangladesh Liberation War was already underway. Many Bengali sailors and officers in the Pakistan Navy defected to form the nascent Bangladesh Navy. Initially, there were two ships, PADMA and PALASH, and 45 navy personnel.  On 9 November 1971, the first naval fleet, consisting of six small patrol vessels, was inaugurated. These ships tried to carry out raids on the Pakistani fleet, but were mistakenly hit and sunk by the Indian Air Force on 10 December 1971. The next major attack was launched on Mongla seaport. According to official figures from the Bangladesh Navy, a total of 334 sailors were involved with the newly created navy, with 22 being killed in action.

Independence to the end of the 20th century
The navy carried out around 45 operations during the war: traditional naval operations and unconventional commando operations including guerrilla warfare.  In the first leg of the war, defecting Bengali sailors joined the guerrilla forces. It was the eight sailors who defected from the Pakistan Navy submarine PNS Mangro, under construction in France, that pioneered the formation of the naval element during the Liberation War.  Later many other naval personnel participated.  During the Liberation War, East Pakistan was divided into 11 sectors.  Each sector had a Commander and a demarcated area of responsibility except sector 10. Sector 10 was nominally responsible for the coastal belt but actually operated over the entire country.

In 1971, it was imperative for the occupation force to keep ports and harbours operative and the sea lines of communication open. The Bangladesh Navy fought to block the sea lines of communication, and to make the sea and river ports inoperative. They attacked all the seaports including many river ports. Operation Jackpot is one of the best known and most successful operations. They carried out mining in the Pasur River Channel by patrol craft. With other fighters they also carried out attacks against the Pakistan Army.  As a result, Bangladesh became an independent state within the shortest possible time.

After independence, especially in the 1970s, additional naval infrastructure was required. The acquisition of these three frigates is considered the principal foundation of the Bangladesh Navy.

21st century

In 2011, the Bangladesh Navy's rescue and medical team, along with the Bangladesh Army, was deployed to Japan after the Tōhoku earthquake and tsunami. The Bangladesh Navy has been an active disaster recovery force abroad. In 2013, the navy deployed  carrying humanitarian assistance worth $1 million. The Bangladesh Navy's medical team was also deployed to the Philippines.

The aircraft was a Boeing 777-200ER which had gone missing with 12 Malaysian crew members and 227 passengers from 14 nations during the flight from Malaysia to China. Later, BNS Umar Farooq was replaced by BNS Somudra Joy. The search was renewed in May 2014 when an Australian exploration company claimed to have traced aircraft debris in the Bay of Bengal. In 2014, during the Water Crisis in Maldives, the Bangladesh Navy was the first to launch humanitarian aid relief by deploying BNS Somudra Joy with 100 tonnes of bottled water.

Forces Goal 2030
In 2009, the Bangladesh government adopted a long-term modernisation plan for its armed forces called Forces Goal 2030. As of 2013, about a third of the military hardware procured under the plan has been for the navy. It procured two refurbished Type 053H2 (Jianghu III) frigates from China in 2014. Two United States Coast Guard High Endurance Cutters joined the BN in 2013 and 2015 which are being used as patrol frigates. Two Type 056 corvettes joined the BN in 2016 while two more were ordered in July 2015 and they are awaiting commissioning. Two  large patrol craft (LPCs) were built in China and joined the BN in 2013. Two more ships of the same class with dedicated ASW capabilities were commissioned in 2017. Five Padma-class patrol vessels have been commissioned into the navy in 2013. Besides, multiple indigenous built LCUs and LCTs have been added to the navy.

The Bangladesh Navy opened its aviation wing on 14 July 2011 with the induction of two AgustaWestland AW109 helicopters. Later on, two Dornier 228NG MPA were introduced in 2013. To attain underwater operational capabilities, the Bangladesh Navy inducted two off-the-shelf Type 035G (Ming class) submarines from China on 12 March 2017.

A new base for the Bangladesh Navy, named BNS Sher-e-Bangla, is being constructed at Rabanabad in Patuakhali. It will be the largest naval base of the Bangladesh Navy with submarine berthing and aviation facilities. Meanwhile, a separate submarine base, named BNS Sheikh Hasina, is under construction at Pekua in Cox's Bazar. A full-fledged naval base, named BNS Sheikh Mujib, has been commissioned in Khilkhet, Dhaka. This is the only operational base in Dhaka naval region.

UN missions, multinational exercises and naval diplomacy

In 1993 the Bangladesh Navy joined United Nations Peacekeeping Operations. Its first UN mission came in 2005, when a Bangladesh Navy contingent was sent to Sudan as Force Riverine Unit (FRU). The BN is the third Asian and only subcontinental navy to serve in the volatile region.

BN ships regularly participate in exercises with other navies, gaining valuable experience and improving their fighting capabilities. CARAT is a yearly exercise conducted with the United States Navy in the Bay of Bengal since 2011. The BN has sent an OPV to every MILAN multinational naval exercise held near the Andaman Islands since 2010. AMAN, another multinational exercise held every two years in the Arabian Sea, organised by the Pakistan Navy, has also seen participation by BN frigates since 2009. BNS Bangabandhu participated in Exercise Ferocious Falcon, a Multinational Crisis Management Exercise, held at Doha, Qatar in November 2012, while BNS Somudra Joy participated the same exercise in 2015.  took part in 14th Western Pacific Naval Symposium and International Fleet Review-2014 in Qingdao, Shandong Province of China in April 2014. She also participated in Langkawi International Maritime and Aerospace Exhibition (LIMA)-2015 held at Malaysia.

Women in Bangladesh Navy
In January 2000, the first batch of 16 female cadets joined Bangladesh Naval Academy for cadet training. In 2016, 44 female sailors were added to the force for the first time. Though, the naval authority has stopped women's recruitment as sailors.

List of Chiefs of Naval Staff

Exercise Somudro Ghurni 

Somudro Ghurni (English: Sea Vortex) is the codename of a series of major naval exercises conducted by the Bangladesh Navy to simulate naval warfare and the protection of the country from external maritime threats, protection of the country's maritime resources, and prevention of smuggling.

Overview
The exercise took place in the Bay of Bengal. It started on 16 November 2015 and lasted 15 days. During the exercise, the navy deployed most of its fleet, including frigates, corvettes, and maritime patrol aircraft. The exercise included search and rescue, logistical, maritime patrol, landing, and warfare exercises. During the exercise, the Navy successfully test launched missiles.

Administration and organisation
Bangladesh Navy (BN) has its headquarters at Banani, Dhaka. According to the Constitution of Bangladesh, the President of Bangladesh is the commander-in chief of Bangladesh Armed Forces. The Chief of Naval Staff (CNS), a four-star Admiral, is the highest admiral, directs the non-combat and combatant operations from the Naval Headquarters (NHQ) in Dhaka. The headquarters has four branches: Operations (O), Personnel (P), Material (M) and Logistics (Log). Each branch is headed by officers who are titled as Principal Staff Officer (PSO) and known as Assistant Chief of Naval Staff (ACNS), e.g., ACNS (O). Under each PSO there are various directorates headed by directors with the rank of Commodore or Captain. Under each director there are deputy directors (DD) and staff officers (SO).
The Bangladesh Navy has ten major combatant command, each command is commanded by a Rear admiral or Commodore, who directly reports to Chief of Naval Staff.

Naval Headquarter Formation of Bangladesh Navy

Area Commanders & Administrative Authority of Bangladesh Navy

Branches
Bangladesh Navy has 6 administrative branches:

The Executive Branch 
 The Executive branch is responsible for Seamanship, Navigation, Communication, Torpedo Anti Submarine, Gunnery and Hydrographic activities.

The Engineering Branch 
 The Engineering branch has responsibility on board ships and at shipyard/dockyard organizations. On board ship the Engineering branch officers and sailors maintain Ships' propulsion system, power generation system, steering gear, auxiliary, ancillary and all mechanical and hydraulic systems of the ship to keep the Ship operational, ensuring its stability, sea keeping, fire fighting and damage control capabilities. At shipyard and dockyard the Engineering branch is engaged in ship repair, ship construction including renovation and new building. They are also responsible for forecasting of machinery spares, inspection & quality control and maintaining the Depot.

The Supply Branch 
 The supply branch is responsible for providing supply support to ships in terms of dry and fresh rations, clothing and secretarial duties.

The Electrical Branch 
 Commonly known as Electrical branch, which is responsible for distribution of power supply in the ship, maintenance of all electrical equipment, propulsion electronic control system, navigation (radar, GPS, echo sounder etc.) and communication equipment (HF sets, VHF set etc.). The major and most important part of their job is to look after the weapon and fire control system, sensors, search and fire control radars. They also contribute to the dockyards and shipyards in similar ways of the Engineering branch.

Education Branch 
 The Education branch remains committed for instructional duties. Officers work in the Naval law department are recruited for education branch. Officers from engineering background are also recruited in the education branch.

Medical Branch 
 Doctors recruited directly for Navy and doctors from Army Medical and Dental corps are also seconded to the Navy for short duration to serve in the ship/establishment and in naval hospital.

Rank structure

Commissioned officers

Other ranks

Shore establishments

Training institutes
The Bangladesh Naval Academy is the home of naval cadets to be the future officers of Bangladesh Navy. The academy provides education, athletic and military training to the naval cadets. The academy also offers training programs to the officers of allied navies including navy personnel from Qatar, Sri Lanka, Maldivian and Palestinian Navy.

Equipment

As of November 2020, the Bangladeshi Navy has five Guided Missile Frigates, two patrol frigates, six Corvettes, thirty-eight minor surface combatants of various types (including patrol vessels, missile boats, and mine hunters), and thirty auxiliaries as surface assets. Submarine branch is equipped with two diesel-electric attack submarines. The naval aviation wing operates both fixed-wing aircraft and rotorcraft. The navy also maintain a special force named SWADS.

Submarines

Bangladesh Navy became the three-dimensional force with the commissioning of two refurbished Type 035G (Ming class) submarines on 12 March 2017.

Ships

Naval aviation

Munitions

Small arms

Future modernization plans 

Bangladesh has made a long term modernisation plan for its Armed Forces named Forces Goal 2030. The plan includes the modernization and expansion of all equipment and infrastructures and providing enhanced training. Bangladesh Navy is setting up a new base at Rabanabad in Patuakhali named BNS Sher-e-Bangla, which will be the largest naval base of the country. The base will have submarine berthing and aviation facilities. A separate submarine base named BNS Sheikh Hasina, is under construction at Pekua in Cox's Bazar. The construction works of a fleet headquarters at the Sandwip channel of Chittagong with ship berthing facilities is already going on.

Khulna Shipyard is currently building five padma-class patrol vessels for the navy. The same shipyard launched two hydrographic research ships and two coastal survey boats for the Bangladesh Navy. The ships are in trial phase now.

BN has issued two tenders for the procurement of four helicopters with anti-submarine warfare (ASW), anti-surface vessel warfare (ASuW), over-the-horizon targeting (OTHT), maritime search and rescue (MSAR), medical evacuation (MEDEVAC), casualty evacuation (CASEVAC) and special mission capabilities. Contract has been signed for two maritime patrol aircraft on 27 March 2017.

Bangladesh Navy issued a tender for the supply of Technical Data Link (TDL) system. The system will connect 16 platforms as 2 frigates, 4 corvettes, 1 LPC, 3 shore stations, 2 helicopters, 2 MPAs and two submarines. In April 2018, Bangladesh Navy issued tender for two X-band navigational radars with helicopter landing control facility for two of its ships. At the same time, another tender was issued for replacing two 40 mm Fast Forty guns on-board BNS Bangabandhu with new 40 mm twin-barrel gun system.

In December 2019, the prime minister discussed about the past, present and future development programs for the Bangladesh Navy at the winter passing out parade of the Bangladesh Naval Academy. She told that the process is going on for procuring more corvettes, minesweepers, oceanographic research ship and sail training ship. Process of constructing six frigates at Chittagong Dry Dock in collaboration with foreign shipbuilders is also going on. Government has taken initiative for making missiles and Identification friend or foe system in Bangladesh. She added that, there is a plan to induct more maritime patrol aircraft, anti-submarine warfare helicopters and long range MPA in the near future.

See also
 Bangladesh Army
 Bangladesh Air Force
 Bangladesh National Cadet Corps (BNCC)
 Bangladesh Coast Guard

References

External links 

 Bangladesh Navy Official website

 
Government agencies of Bangladesh
Military units and formations established in 1971
Recipients of the Independence Day Award
Uniformed services of Bangladesh